Erich Seidel (born 1884, date of death unknown) was a German swimmer. He competed in the men's 200 metre breaststroke event at the 1908 Summer Olympics.

References

1884 births
Year of death missing
German male swimmers
Olympic swimmers of Germany
Swimmers at the 1908 Summer Olympics
Place of birth missing